Zhang Yawen (born 9 March 1985) is a badminton player from China.

Career 
Zhang has specialized in women's doubles and mixed doubles, earning numerous international titles in both events. At various times she has partnered either Zhang Dan, or Zhao Tingting, or Wei Yili to women's doubles victories at the French (2002, 2007), German (2004), Thailand (2004), Singapore (2005, 2007), Indonesia (2006), China (2008), and Hong Kong (2008) Opens. Prior to 2009 her biggest triumph came with Wei Yili at the prestigious All-England Championships in 2007 where they defeated compatriots Gao Ling and Huang Sui, and Yang Wei and Zhang Jiewen, the two dominant teams of the era, respectively in the semifinals and finals. All of her mixed doubles titles have been earned in partnership with Xie Zhongbo and they include the Badminton World Cup (2005), the China Masters (2006, 2008), and the Hong Kong (2005, 2008), Indonesia (2006), Macau (2007), and Thailand (2008) Opens.

Before 2009 Zhang had earned five medals, without yet "striking gold", at the BWF World Championships. At the 2005 tournament she took a bronze in women's doubles with Zhang Dan, and a silver with Xie Zhongbo in mixed doubles behind Indonesia's Lilyana Natsir and Nova Widianto. At the 2006 tournament Zhang and Wei Yili upset Yang Wei and Zhang Jiewen in the semifinals but were beaten in the final by Gao Ling and Huang Sui. Zhang was eliminated in the semifinals of both doubles events at the 2007 edition in Kuala Lumpur.

At the 2008 Beijing Olympics she and Wei Yili were ousted from women's doubles gold medal contention in the semifinals by the eventual champions, compatriots Du Jing and Yu Yang. In the playoff for third place they salvaged a bronze medal by defeating Japan's Miyuki Maeda and Satoko Suetsuna.

2009 proved to be Zhang's most successful season. With Zhao Tingting she captured women's doubles titles at the two most prestigious events for individual players outside of the Olympics, the All-England Championships and the BWF World Championships, defeating compatriots Cheng Shu and Zhao Yunlei in the final of each.

Achievements

Olympic Games 
Women's doubles

BWF World Championships 
Women's doubles

Mixed doubles

World Cup 
Women's doubles

Mixed doubles

Asian Games 
Mixed doubles

Asian Championships 
Women's doubles

East Asian Games 
Mixed doubles

World Junior Championships 
Girls' doubles

Mixed doubles

Asian Junior Championships 
Girls' singles

Girls' doubles

Mixed doubles

BWF Superseries 
The BWF Superseries, which was launched on 14 December 2006 and implemented in 2007, is a series of elite badminton tournaments, sanctioned by the Badminton World Federation (BWF). BWF Superseries levels are Superseries and Superseries Premier. A season of Superseries consists of twelve tournaments around the world that have been introduced since 2011. Successful players are invited to the Superseries Finals, which are held at the end of each year.

Women's doubles

Mixed doubles

  BWF Superseries Finals tournament
  BWF Superseries Premier tournament
  BWF Superseries tournament

BWF Grand Prix 
The BWF Grand Prix had two levels, the BWF Grand Prix and Grand Prix Gold. It was a series of badminton tournaments sanctioned by the Badminton World Federation (BWF) which was held from 2007 to 2017. The World Badminton Grand Prix has been sanctioned by the International Badminton Federation from 1983 to 2006.

Women's doubles

Mixed doubles

  BWF Grand Prix Gold tournament
  BWF & IBF Grand Prix tournament

IBF International 
Women's doubles

Mixed doubles

References

External links 
 
 

1985 births
Living people
Badminton players from Chongqing
Chinese female badminton players
Badminton players at the 2008 Summer Olympics
Olympic badminton players of China
Olympic bronze medalists for China
Olympic medalists in badminton
Medalists at the 2008 Summer Olympics
Badminton players at the 2006 Asian Games
Asian Games gold medalists for China
Asian Games silver medalists for China
Asian Games medalists in badminton
Medalists at the 2006 Asian Games
World No. 1 badminton players